Hoggard may refer to:

People
 Alfonso Hoggard (born 1989), U.S. American football player
 Jacob Hoggard (born 1984), Canadian singer, lead singer of Hedley
 Jay Hoggard (born 1954), American vibraphonist
 Johnathan Hoggard (born 2000), British racing car driver
 Matthew Hoggard (born 1978), British cricketer

Facilities and structures
 John T. Hoggard High School, Wilmington, North Carolina, USA
 Mabel Hoggard Magnet School (elementary school), Clark County, Nevada, USA

See also

 
Haggard (disambiguation)
Hoggar